The common gull or sea mew (Larus canus) is a medium-sized gull that breeds in the Palearctic, northern Europe. The closely related short-billed gull is sometimes included in this species, which may be known collectively as "mew gull". Many common gulls migrate further south in winter. There are differing accounts as to how the species acquired its vernacular name (see Etymology section below).

The name "sea mew" is a calque of the Dutch name "zee meeuw".

Description

It is further distinguished from the ring-billed gull by its shorter, more tapered bill, which is a more greenish shade of yellow and is unmarked during the breeding season. The body is grey above and white below. The legs are yellow in breeding season, becoming duller in the winter. In winter, the head is streaked grey and the bill often has a poorly defined blackish band near the tip, which is sometimes sufficiently obvious to cause confusion with ring-billed gull. They have black wingtips with large white "mirrors" on the outer primaries p9 and p10, which are smaller than those in the short-billed gull. Young birds have scaly black-brown upperparts and a neat wing pattern, and pink legs which become greyish in the second year before tuning yellow. By the first winter, the head and belly are white, with fine streaks and greyish feathers grow on the saddle. They take three years (up to four in the Kamchatka subspecies) to reach maturity. The call is a high-pitched "laughing" cry.

Taxonomy
There are three subspecies, with the Kamchatka gull (L. (c.) kamtschatschensis) being considered a distinct species by some authorities. 
 L. c. canus – Linnaeus, 1758 – common gull. nominate, found in Europe and western Asia. Small; mantle medium grey (palest subspecies); wingtips with extensive black; iris dark. First-year birds develop white feathers on the head and belly with fine dark markings. Wingspan ; mass .
 L. c. heinei – Homeyer, 1853 – Russian common gull. Found in central northern Asia. Larger than canus with a more sloping forehead which gives the appearance of a smaller bill. Eyes are usually paler, bill and legs deeper yellow than canus with weaker dark bill markings in winter.  The wings are proportionally longer with more black on p5-p8 than canus with narrow white spots forming a conspicuous "string of pearls". p4 has black markings which are rare in canus. First-year immatures have a whiter head, belly and underwings than canus at the same age, with an unmarked rump and more defined black tail band.  Intergrades are common in west Russia. Mass .
 L. c. kamtschatschensis – Bonaparte, 1857; syn. L. kamtschatschensis – Kamchatka gull. Found in northeastern Asia. The largest subspecies, its size is intermediate between common and ring-billed gulls with the largest males approaching the size of black-tailed gull. Head is squarer with a flatter forehead and the bill is thicker and longer than canus, with paler eyes and deeper yellow bill and legs. Mantle medium-dark grey; wingtips with extensive black, with markings on p5-p8 forming a "string of pearls". Plumage development is generally slower than canus; first-year immatures retain juvenile feathers through the winter, appearing darker and browner overall, and the tail has more extensive black. Brown covert wing feathers are still retained in the second winter. Mass .
The North American short-billed gull was formerly widely considered conspecific with this species (as Larus canus brachyrhynchus), but most authorities now recognize it as a distinct species, L. brachyrhynchus, based on differences in genetics, morphology and vocalizations. Though "mew gull" was formerly used as a name for Larus canus sensu lato in North America and not commonly used outside North America, the name "short-billed gull" was chosen for L. brachyrhynchus by the AOS due to the usage of mew gull in recent literature to denote all forms of the L. canus complex, the revival of the name short-billed gull in some of the same literature for brachyrhynchus, and the fact that short-billed gull was historically used for brachyrhynchus when it was treated as a distinct species in the first through third editions of the AOU (now AOS) checklist (in which the name mew gull, contrary to more recent usage, was specifically reserved for the Old World forms).

Ecology
Both common and short-billed gulls breed colonially near water or in marshes, making a lined nest on the ground or in a small tree; colony size varies from 2 to 320 or even more pairs. Usually three eggs are laid (sometimes just one or two); they hatch after 24–26 days, with the chicks fledging after a further 30–35 days. Like most gulls, they are omnivores and will scavenge as well as hunt small prey. The global population is estimated to be about one million pairs; they are most numerous in Europe, with over half (possibly as much as 80-90%) of the world population. By contrast, the short-billed gull population in Alaska is only about 10,000 pairs.

Vagrancy
The common gull occurs as a scarce winter visitor to coastal eastern Canada and as a vagrant to the northeastern USA. The Kamchatka gull is occasionally seen in northwestern North America mainly in spring, and there is one autumn record in Newfoundland.

Etymology
The scientific name is from Latin. Larus appears to have referred to a gull or other large seabird, and canus is "grey". The name "common gull" was coined by Thomas Pennant in 1768 because he considered it the most numerous of its genus. Others assert that the name does not indicate its abundance, but that during the winter it feeds on common land, short pasture used for grazing. John Ray earlier used the name common sea-mall. As the species is not particularly common in much of Britain (where it is greatly outnumbered by several other gull species), it is sometimes said, tongue in cheek, that "uncommon gull" would be a more accurate description.

There are many old British regional names for this species, typically variations on maa, mar, and mew. The original English word mew is related to German möwe and Dutch meeuw. In Norse influenced regions of Britain, variations include maw or sea-maw, the old Norfolk form being mow. The word gull comes from a Celtic root, with the first recorded usage in English from the 1400s; the modern Welsh form is gwylan.

References

External links

 
 
 
 
 
 
 
 

common gull
Holarctic birds
common gull
common gull